The Java War (1825–30) was fought between the Diponegoro and the Dutch Empire.

Java War may also refer to:
First Javanese War of Succession (1704–07), civil war
Second Javanese War of Succession (1719–23), civil war
Java War (1741–43), between the Javanese and Dutch
Third Javanese War of Succession (1749–57), civil war
Invasion of Java (1811), between the British and Dutch

See also
Invasion of Java (disambiguation)
WAR file format (Sun), for Java applications